The Halo Is Slipping (Swedish: Med glorian på sned) is a 1957 Swedish comedy film directed by Hasse Ekman and starring Ekman, Sickan Carlsson, Sture Lagerwall and Yvonne Lombard. It was shot at the Råsunda Studios in Stockholm. The film's sets were designed by the art director P.A. Lundgren.

Plot summary 
Birgitta Lövgren works as a secretary for the publisher Per-Axel Dahlander. Under the pseudonym Eurydice, she writes a romance novel, which she sends to Anders Dahls publishing house anonymously. The story circles around a nurse who has increasingly drifted away from her husband and is harbouring warm feelings towards her boss. To twist everything around Birgittas husbands mistress, Vera Alm, claims that she has written the novel. Birgitta can't expose her lies since she does not want anyone to know that she has written it, especially her boss...

Cast
Sickan Carlsson as Birgitta Lövgren, secretary 
Hasse Ekman as Per-Axel Dahlander, publisher
Sture Lagerwall as Sixten Lövgren, violinist
Yvonne Lombard as Vera Alm
Siv Ericks as Miss Svensson
Olof Sandborg as doctor Petreus
Holger Löwenadler as Broberg
Stig Järrel as Karl Antån 
Claes-Håkan Westergren as Hiker  
Olof Thunberg as Liljeroth 
Hans Strååt as Yngve Englund
Hariette Garellick as Mrs. Englund 
Börje Mellvig as Lundmark 
Carl-Axel Elfving as Kalle, Miss Svenssons boyfriend 
Arthur Fischer as Kronstrand
 Bengt Blomgren as 	Band leader at Radiotjänst 
 Gösta Prüzelius as	Maitre d' 
 Eric Gustafson as Hotel Manager

References

External links

1957 films
1957 comedy films
Swedish comedy films
Films directed by Hasse Ekman
1950s Swedish-language films
1950s Swedish films